Kenneth ("Ken") John Lorraway (6 February 1956 – 4 January 2007) was an Australian triple jumper, who represented his native country twice at the Summer Olympics: 1980 and 1984 and Commonwealth Games: 1978 and 1982. His best Olympic result was finishing in 8th place in Moscow, USSR with a leap of 16.44 metres.

He was born in Wagga Wagga, New South Wales. He attended Watson High School in Canberra and participated in junior athletics with the North Canberra Athletic Club. Between 1974 and 1978, he attended the Southern Illinois University in the United States on an athletic scholarship. In 1978, he was selected as an All American. He won the silver medal at the 1982 Commonwealth Games after an epic battle with Keith Connor. He won Australian national senior triple jump title five times between 1979/80 to 1984/84. He was also a successful long jumper. 
He was an inaugural athletics scholarship holder at the Australian Institute of Sport (AIS) where he was coached by Kelvin Giles.

He married AIS long jumper Robyn Strong, a silver medallist at the 1982 Commonwealth Games. They had three children - two boys Alex and Sebastian and a daughter Madeline. Alex has followed in his father's footsteps as a triple jumper. In 1997, he was inducted into the ACT Sports Hall of Fame.

Lorraway died in Canberra, aged fifty, of a suspected heart attack.

Achievements

References

1956 births
2007 deaths
Australian male triple jumpers
Olympic athletes of Australia
Athletes (track and field) at the 1980 Summer Olympics
Athletes (track and field) at the 1982 Commonwealth Games
Athletes (track and field) at the 1978 Commonwealth Games
Athletes (track and field) at the 1984 Summer Olympics
Commonwealth Games silver medallists for Australia
Sportspeople from Wagga Wagga
Australian Institute of Sport track and field athletes
Commonwealth Games medallists in athletics
20th-century Australian people
21st-century Australian people
Medallists at the 1982 Commonwealth Games